The Silencers are a Scottish rock band formed in London in 1986 by Jimme O'Neill and Cha Burns, two ex-members of the post-punk outfit Fingerprintz. Their music is characterised by a melodic blend of pop, folk and traditional Celtic influences. Often compared to Scottish bands with a similar sound like Big Country, Del Amitri and The Proclaimers, The Silencers have distinguished themselves with their eclectic sounds, prolific output and continued career. Their first single, "Painted Moon," was a minor international hit and invited critical comparisons to Simple Minds and U2. In 1987 they released their first album A Letter From St. Paul, which included "Painted Moon" and another minor hit, "I See Red." Buoyed by the huge European hit "Bulletproof Heart", the band's third album Dance to the Holy Man is the band's commercial peak to date. Throughout the 1990s, The Silencers saw a  popular taste shift away from their songwriter-based style of music toward grunge and electronic music.

History
Before forming The Silencers, vocalist Jimme O'Neill and guitarist Cha Burns were active in London's new wave music scene. O'Neill wrote songs for Paul Young and Lene Lovich, while Burns played guitar in Adam Ant's backing band during 1982–1984, together with Fingerprintz drummer Bogdan Wiczling. O'Neill, who, in the mid 1970s, had worked for a time as a clerical assistant in the Department of Health and Social Security, released a single for Oval Records in 1975, "Achin' in My Heart"/"Cold on Me", under the name Jimme Shelter (a throwback to the song, "Gimme Shelter" by The Rolling Stones).

1980s
In 1979, they met and formed a post-punk/new wave project called Fingerprintz, and released three albums under that name: The Very Dab, Distinguishing Marks and Beat Noir. They earned some critical recognition and notable appearances on John Peel's BBC Radio 1 show and the BBC's In Concert radio series.  The group split in 1985. Then O'Neill formed a duo with electropop singer Jacqui Brookes and they released two singles in 1983: "Haunted Cocktails" and "Lost Without Your Love". When Brookes subsequently released solo album Sob Stories, O'Neill wrote or co-wrote a majority of the tracks and played guitar and other instruments on the album.

Soon O'Neill and Burns were playing music together again, this time joined by drummer Martin Hanlin and bass player Joseph Donnelly, a cousin of Simple Minds singer Jim Kerr. After considering band names like 'My Granny's Green Chair' and 'The Hot Dog From Hell', they settled on 'The Silencers'. In September 1986, they began to tour Europe and the United Kingdom. They demoed three new songs at Scarf Studios in London: "Painted Moon", "I See Red"  and "I Can't Cry". The demos earned them a recording contract with RCA Records, and their song "Painted Moon", about O'Neill's personal reaction to the Falklands War, was included on the soundtrack to the film The Home Front, and then released as their first single in April 1987. Their first album A Letter from St. Paul included re-recorded versions of all three demos. The Pretenders invited the band to support them on their European tour, and then the success of Painted Moon across the pond induced a tour of the United States on their own, and later with Squeeze.

In 1988, The Silencers toured Europe with The Alarm and Painted Moon became a radio hit in the UK. The band moved back to Scotland and recorded a second album A Blues for Buddha at CaVa Studios in Glasgow, with Flood producing. The standout tracks were "Scottish Rain", about love and fallout from Chernobyl, and "The Real McCoy" which became a fan favourite. The band then toured Europe with Simple Minds for four months, culminating with a stadium show at Wembley in front of 80,000.

1990s
After the tour, the band began work on third album Dance to the Holy Man, but personal conflict derailed the process. Donnelly and Hanlin left the band, and were replaced by Tony Soave on drums and Lewis Rankine on bass. The album, a departure from the band's "guitar-based atmosphere pop", was recorded during the summer of 1990. It included funk, blues, and Celtic strains. The O'Neill-penned "This Is Serious" had previously been submitted to other artists and had been recorded twice prior to The Silencers' version; in 1987 Eric Martin recorded it for his I'm Only Fooling Myself album, and one year later Marilyn Martin recorded it for her 1988 album, which took its name from the track.
The single "Bulletproof Heart", a re-recording of a track from the Fingerprintz album Distinguishing Marks, and later to be covered by Jim Kerr for his Lostboy project. It became a hit in Spain and France, where the band had success at that time. The album sales lagged back in the United Kingdom, although it did enter the UK Top 40 chart, their first and last entry to date. JJ Gilmour joined the band as a second male vocalist before another tour of Europe, and Stevie Kane joined the band, replacing Rankine during the tour due to personality conflict.

Deeply in debt to RCA and not having the expected success in the UK, The Silencers were in danger of being dropped by their record label despite their success throughout Europe. However, after label representatives saw an impressive live show they allowed the band to begin work on fourth album Seconds of Pleasure. "I Can Feel It" (the video for which featured a cameo role from Frances Corrigan, O'Neill's daughter's friend from Coatbridge) was, true to form, a hit in Europe and ignored in the UK. Without tour support from RCA, the band financed its own tour to Switzerland, France and Scotland.

In 1994, The Silencers signed to new labels: Permanent for Britain and BMG for France. That summer they recorded a cover of the song "Wild Mountain Thyme", featuring O'Neill's daughter Aura on vocals. It became a hit in Scotland after featuring in a tourism board advertising campaign. Soon after, they completed fifth album So Be It.

After a mid-1996 tour of Europe, Gilmour and Soave left the band. Jim McDermott of the Kevin McDermott Orchestra joined on drums and Aura O'Neill became a permanent member of the band. The year 1996 brought the release of singles compilation Blood & Rain, and The Silencers took several years off from recording.

In 1999, the band worked on seventh album Receiving, which was financed by money from festival appearances in Europe. Speaking of the new record, O'Neill said, "Some of the new tracks were recorded as if this was a different band. I wanted to forget about everything we'd done before and some of what came out reminded me of Fingerprintz – new wave for the nineties!" The experimental nature of the songs, he said, was inspired by the influence of Jack Kerouac, William S. Burroughs and Charles Bukowski.

2000s
In 2001, the band released their first live album, A Night of Electric Silence, recorded in Glasgow in 2000, with McDermott on drums, Stevie Kane on bass, Phil Kane on keyboards, O'Neill on guitar and vocals, Milla on violin and Aura O'Neill on vocals.

In November 2004, Come was released, featuring the tracks "Siddharta", "Let It Happen" and "Head". However, by this time most of the band's albums were out of print. In July 2006, Baptiste Brondy, a 20-year-old French drummer, replaced McDermott. Burns was six days past his 50th birthday when he died of lung cancer in the Welsh seaside resort of Prestatyn on 26 March 2007.

Discography

Albums
 A Letter From St. Paul (1987), RCA
 A Blues for Buddha (1988), RCA
 Dance to the Holy Man (1991) - UK #39
 Seconds of Pleasure (1993), RCA - UK #52
 So Be It (1995), BMG France
 Receiving (1999), Uncanny Records
 A Night of Electric Silence (2001), Last Call/Wagram Music
 Come (2004), Keltia Musique
 En Concert (2006), Keltia Musique
 Real (2008), Keltia Musique

Compilation albums
 Blood and Rain (1996), BMG France

Singles
"Painted Moon" (1987) - No. 57 UK, No. 82 US, No. 41 AUS
"I Can't Cry" (1987)
"I See Red" (1988) - No. 93 UK
"Answer Me" (1988) - No. 89 UK
"The Real McCoy" (1988) - No. 81 UK
"Scottish Rain" (1989) - No. 71 UK
"Razor Blades of Love" (1989) - No. 23 US Modern Rock
"I Want You" (1991)
"Bulletproof Heart" (1991)
"Hey Mr. Bank Manager" (1991)
"I Can Feel It" (1993) - No. 62 UK
"Number One Friend" (1995)
"Something Worth Fighting For" (1995)
"27" (1995)
"Wild Mountain Thyme" (1995)

References

External links
UK based official site
Fingerprintz/Silencers fan site with bio, discography and photos
A Brief history of Fingerprintz
Trouser Press band summary
Last Call Records site for A Night of Electric Silence
Official site of former member JJ Gilmour
Cha Burns obituary in The Herald (Glasgow)

Celtic fusion groups
Musical groups established in 1987
Scottish rock music groups